USK Praha history and statistics in FIBA Europe and Euroleague Basketball (company) competitions.

European competitions

Worldwide competitions

Record
USK Praha has overall from 1965 to 1966 (first participation) to 1997–98 (last participation): 79 wins against 80 defeats plus 4 draws in 163 games for all the European club competitions.

 EuroLeague: 48–40 plus 3 draws (91)
 FIBA Saporta Cup: 22–24 (44)
 FIBA Korać Cup: 11–6 plus 1 draw (28)

Also USK has a 1–4 record in the FIBA Intercontinental Cup.

See also 
 Czechoslovak basketball clubs in European competitions

External links
FIBA Europe
Euroleague
ULEB
Eurocup

SK Slavia Prague
Sport in Prague
Basketball teams in the Czech Republic
Basketball teams established in 1953